Tai Tseng Wai is a walled village in Wang Chau, Yuen Long District, Hong Kong.

Location
Tai Tseng Wai is located north of Kai Shan and Yuen Long Industrial Estate, next to the villages of Shing Uk Tsuen and Ng Uk Tsuen. The area north of the villages, Fung Lok Wai, features fish ponds.

Administration
Tai Tseng Wai is a recognized village under the New Territories Small House Policy. It is one of the 37 villages represented within the Ping Shan Rural Committee. For electoral purposes, Tai Tseng Wai is part of the Ping Shan North constituency.

Features
The three villages of Tai Tseng Wai, Ng Uk Tsuen and Shing Uk Tsuen all share the gods hall in Tai Tseng Wai and the Tin Hau temple near Ng Uk Tsuen.

See also
 Walled villages of Hong Kong

References

Further reading

External links

 Delineation of area of existing village Tai Tseng Wai (Ping Shan) for election of resident representative (2019 to 2022)
 Map showing the location of Ungraded Built Heritage Resources (HB): 
 Pictures of Tai Tseng Wai

Walled villages of Hong Kong
Wang Chau (Yuen Long)
Villages in Yuen Long District, Hong Kong